Vissulaid is a small, uninhabited island in the Baltic Sea belonging to the country of Estonia. Its coordinates are 

Vissulaid lies just off the northern coast of the island of Hiiumaa, and as such, it is administered by Hiiu County. The closest human settlement to Vissulaid is Kärdla, which lies just southwest of Vissulaid on Hiiumaa.

See also
 List of islands of Estonia

References
 

Uninhabited islands of Estonia
Hiiumaa Parish
Estonian islands in the Baltic